Belarus participated at the 2018 Summer Youth Olympics in Buenos Aires, Argentina from 6 October to 18 October 2018.

Medalists
Medals awarded to participants of mixed-NOC teams are represented in italics. These medals are not counted towards the individual NOC medal tally.

| width="22%" align="left" valign="top" |

Competitors

Archery

Belarus qualified one archer based on its performance at the 2018 European Youth Championships.

Individual

Team

Athletics

Boys
Field events

Girls
Track events

Field events

Canoeing

Girls

Gymnastics

Acrobatic
Belarus qualified a mixed pair based on its performance at the 2018 Acrobatic Gymnastics World Championship.

Artistic
Belarus qualified one gymnast based on its performance at the 2018 European Junior Championship.

Girls

Rhythmic
Belarus qualified one rhythmic gymnast based on its performance at the European qualification event.

Trampoline
Belarus qualified one gymnast based on its performance at the 2018 European Junior Championship.

Multidiscipline

Judo

Individual

Team

Modern pentathlon

Belarus qualified one athlete based on its performance at the 2018 Youth A World Championship.

Rowing

Belarus qualified one boat based on its performance at the 2017 World Junior Rowing Championships.

Qualification Legend: FA=Final A (medal); FB=Final B (non-medal); FC=Final C (non-medal); FD=Final D (non-medal); SA/B=Semifinals A/B; SC/D=Semifinals C/D; R=Repechage

Sailing

Belarus qualified one boat based on its performance at the Techno 293+ European Qualifier.

Shooting

Belarus qualified one sport shooter based on its performance at the 2017 European Championships.

Individual

Team

Swimming

Boys

Girls

Table tennis

Belarus qualified one table tennis player based on its performance at the European Continental Qualifier.

Tennis

Singles

Doubles

Wrestling

Key:
  – Victory by Fall
  – Without any points scored by the opponent
  – With point(s) scored by the opponent
  – Without any points scored by the opponent
  – With point(s) scored by the opponent

References

2018 in Belarusian sport
Nations at the 2018 Summer Youth Olympics
Belarus at the Youth Olympics